Bungalow is an inner suburb of Cairns in the Cairns Region, Queensland, Australia. In the  Bungalow had a population of 2,159 people.

Geography 
The suburb is bounded to the north by Mulgrave Street (one of the major thoroughfares through Cairns connecting the Bruce Highway from the south to the Captain Cook Highway to the north) and by Hartley Street to the south. The suburb is almost entirely freehold and has a mixture of residential and commercial areas with no green space or other civic amenities.

History 
Bungalow is situated in the Yidinji traditional Aboriginal country.

The suburb name comes from "The Bungalow", the residence of Archdeacon Joseph Campbell, a clergyman and agricultural entrepreneur.

The Cairns Germania Club was established on 4 July 1971 to cater for the needs of German speaking migrants with an initial nine members. The club's activities expanded to include folk dancing. In July 1980 the club wanted a clubhouse and purchased a former church in Winkworth Street for $21,000. In 1991 the organisation renamed itself the German-Austrian-Swiss Association to reflect their wider German-speaking membership, and later simplified their trading name to German Club Cairns.

Bungalow railway station was on Spence Street on the North Coast railway line . The railway line has been re-aligned and the station has been dismantled.

In the  Bungalow had a population of 2,159 people.

Education 
There are no schools in Bungalow. The nearest government primary schools are Parramatta State School in neighbouring Parramatta Park to the north-east and Balaclava State School in neighbouring Mooroobool to the west. The nearest government secondary school is Trinity Bay State High School in Manunda to the north.

Amenities 
Showground Shopping Centre is at 157-173 Mulgrave Road. It takes its name from the nearby Cairns Showground in neighbouring Parramatta Park.

The German Club Cairns is at 57 Winkworth Street.

References

External links